The Eastern Regional Hospital also known as Koforidua Regional Hospital is a regional and proposed teaching hospital in Koforidua in the Eastern region of Ghana.  The Koforidua Regional Hospital was established in 1926. The hospital is located in the New Jauben Municipality in the Eastern Region.

Facilities and Departments 
In total, the hospital has around 360 beds. The hospital has a 24-hour OPD and emergency services. The clinical departments include

 Obstetric and Gynaecology
 Internal Medicine
 Pediatrics
 Surgical
 Nursing Administration
 Pharmacy
 Dental
 Radiology
 E.N.T.
 Eye
 Laboratory
 Physiotherapy
 Public health
 Herbal
 Psychiatry
 Nutrition

Emergencies 
The hospital's emergency ward was renovated in 2020 to make room for more patients during the COVID-19 pandemic.

References

Hospitals in Ghana
Koforidua